Stolen may refer to:

 Stolen (2009 Australian film), a 2009 Australian film
 Stolen (2009 American film), a 2009 American film
 Stolen: The Baby Kahu Story (2010 film), a film based on the real life kidnapping of baby Kahu Durie in New Zealand.
 Stolen (2012 film), a film by Simon West, starring Nicolas Cage
 Stolen (Armstrong novel), a 2003 novel by Kelley Armstrong
 Stolen (Christopher novel), a 2009 novel by Lucy Christopher
 "Stolen" (Dashboard Confessional song), 2006
 "Stolen" (Jay Sean song), 2004
 Stolen (play), a 1998 Australian play by Jane Harrison
 Stolen (video game), a 2005 stealth-based video game
 Stolen!, a 2016 mobile app
 STOLEN, Chinese rock band
 "Stolen" (Agents of S.H.I.E.L.D.), an episode of Agents of S.H.I.E.L.D.

See also 
 Stole (disambiguation)
 Stolin, a town in Belarus
 Stollen, a German Christmas cake